Inside/Out is a 1997 American drama film directed by Rob Tregenza. It was screened in the Un Certain Regard section at the 1997 Cannes Film Festival.

Cast
 Stefania Rocca - Grace Patterson
 Frédéric Pierrot - Jean Hammett
 Bérangère Allaux - Monique Phillips
 Mikkel Gaup - Eric Johnson
 Steven Anthony Watkins - Roger Freeman (as Steven Watkins)
 Tom Gilroy - David Sheppard
 David Roland Frank

References

External links

1997 films
1997 drama films
American independent films
Films directed by Rob Tregenza
1997 independent films
1990s English-language films
1990s American films
American drama films
English-language drama films